Doménica Cristina Tabacchi Rendón (born February 21, 1973) is an Ecuadorian journalist and politician. She currently serves as Vice mayor of Guayaquil, which is Ecuador's largest city, being the first woman ever to obtain the charge. Nathalie Viteri, who became a delegate to the National Assembly, worked in the mayor's office. She was Tabacchi's alternate councilor.

References 

1973 births
Ecuadorian journalists
Living people
People from Guayaquil
Ecuadorian women journalists
21st-century Ecuadorian women politicians
21st-century Ecuadorian politicians